is a Japanese figure skater. She is the 2021 NHK Trophy silver medalist, the 2022 CS U.S. Classic bronze medalist, the 2021–22 Japanese national bronze medalist, and the 2019–20 Japanese junior national champion. Kawabe is the eighteenth woman to land a clean triple Axel internationally. She represented Japan at the 2022 Winter Olympics.

Personal life 
Mana Kawabe was born on October 31, 2004 in Nagoya, Japan. She enjoys reading. Kawabe looks up to former training mate Rika Kihira.

Career

Early career 
Kawabe began skating in 2009 after being inspired by fellow Nagoya native Mao Asada. She was coached by Hiroshi Nagakubo, Yoriko Naruse, Miho Kawaume, and Yuko Hongo at Howa Sports Land in Nagoya until Nagakubo's retirement in 2017. Kawabe then switched to her current coaches, Mie Hamada, Yamato Tamura, Haruko Okamoto, and Cathy Reed, and moved to train with them in Takatsuki.

Kawabe is the 2015–16 Japanese national novice B silver medalist. On the advanced novice level internationally, she is the 2017 Coupe du Printemps and 2017 Asian Open Trophy champion. Kawabe did not qualify for the 2018–19 Japan Junior Championships and competed with an injury for much of the season.

2019–2020 season 
Kawabe made her junior international debut at 2019 JGP United States, placing fifth. She then improved to fourth at 2019 JGP Croatia. In October 2019, Kawabe won Kinki Regionals ahead of Moa Iwano and Riko Takino before winning Western Sectionals in November ahead of Nana Araki and Hanna Yoshida.

At the 2019–20 Japan Junior Championships, Kawabe led Tomoe Kawabata and Rino Matsuike in the short program by over a point. She then landed her first officially ratified triple Axel in the free skate and completed eight clean triple jumps to take the title over Kawabata and Yoshida by nearly fifteen points. Kawabe told the media afterwards: "This is unbelievable. I didn’t think I could win." As junior national champion, she was named to represent Japan at the 2020 Winter Youth Olympics and the 2020 World Junior Championships. Kawabe was also invited to compete in the senior division at the 2019–20 Japan Championships, alongside the rest of the top six finishers in the junior division.

Kawabe struggled in both the short program and the free skating at 2019–20 Japan Championships to finish thirteenth overall. However, she successfully landed her opening triple Axel in the free skating and said her "satisfaction was about 65%."

At the 2020 Winter Youth Olympics in January, Kawabe set personal bests in all segments to finish fourth overall behind You Young of South Korea and Russians Kseniia Sinitsyna and Anna Frolova. She expressed disappointment at her mistakes on her triple Axel and her triple Lutz. Kawabe was the only member of the Japanese team not drawn for the team event.

Kawabe skated a clean short program to place eighth at the 2020 World Junior Championships but made several mistakes in the free skating to drop to eleventh overall.

2020–2021 season
Kawabe won the silver medal at the Kinki Regional Championship before coming fourth at Western Sectionals.  She was assigned to make her senior international debut at the 2020 NHK Trophy, in a Grand Prix field that, due to the COVID-19 pandemic, was attended primarily by Japanese skaters. She was sixth in the short program, falling on her attempted triple Axel.  She was sixth in the free skate and overall as well.

Kawabe ranked sixth at the 2020–21 Japan Championships.

2021–2022 season
Initially, without any Grand Prix assignments, Kawabe was named as a replacement skater at the 2021 Skate Canada International following the withdrawal of Alexia Paganini. She was twelfth of twelve skaters after the short program but was sixth in the free skate and rose to ninth place overall. She landed a triple Axel in the free skate, albeit deemed a quarter short of rotation by the technical panel,  obtaining a new personal best in that segment and in total score. Kawabe received a second assignment to the 2021 NHK Trophy, following the injury-related withdrawal of Rika Kihira. Second in the short program with a landed triple Axel, she was fourth in the free skate but remained in second place overall and took the silver medal.

At the 2021–22 Japan Championships, Kawabe placed third in the short program, landing a triple Axel in that segment. She was third in the free as well, again landing the triple Axel but with a few other jump errors. The following day she was named to the Japanese Olympic team. In the 2022 Winter Olympics women's event short program, Kawabe fell on her triple Axel attempt, scoring 62.69 and placing fifteenth in the segment. An error-riddled free skate saw her drop to twenty-third. She was fifteenth at the 2022 World Championships to end the season.

2022–2023 season
Kawabe began her season with a bronze medal at the 2022 CS U.S. International Figure Skating Classic. On the Grand Prix, she first competed at the 2022 Grand Prix de France, where she finished third in the short program, but dropped to sixth place overall after an error-riddled free skate. At her second event, the 2022 Grand Prix of Espoo, Kawabe was again third in the short program despite a slight under rotation on her triple flip. She indicated that she had been focusing on training her free skate, hoping to avoid "repeating the same mistakes." She managed a season's best score in the free skate, placing second in that second and holding third overall to take the bronze medal.

At the 2022–23 Japan Championships, Kawabe came in ninth place. Two months later, she won the bronze medal at the International Challenge Cup, joining Kaori Sakamoto and Mai Mihara in a Japanese sweep of the podium, and finishing second in the free skate after a disappointing ninth in the short program.

Programs

Competitive highlights 
GP: Grand Prix; CS: Challenger Series; JGP: Junior Grand Prix

2019–20 season to present

Earlier career

Detailed results

Senior level

Junior level

References

External links 
 
 Mana Kawabe at the Japan Skating Federation

2004 births
Living people
Japanese female single skaters
Figure skaters from Nagoya
Figure skaters at the 2020 Winter Youth Olympics
Figure skaters at the 2022 Winter Olympics
Olympic figure skaters of Japan